Anobium inexspectatum is a species of beetle in the family Ptinidae. It is native to Europe, its distribution extending to Azerbaijan. The larvae are found only on common ivy (Hedera helix).

References

Anobiinae
Beetles described in 1954